Louis-Marc Germishuys (born 23 March 1967) is a South African cricketer. He played in 26 first-class and 21 List A matches for Boland in 1993/94 and 1995/96.

See also
 List of Boland representative cricketers

References

External links
 

1967 births
Living people
South African cricketers
Boland cricketers
Cricketers from Cape Town